Fran Rooney is an Irish businessman, Barrister-At-Law and is Executive Chairman of Healthcare company Blocknubie Limited which supplies solutions in the Blockchain and Artificial Intelligence space. He.also has a strong football background and was CEO of the Football Association of Ireland association football. He is also a Chartered Accountant and Fellow of the Institute of Chartered Accountants in Ireland.

As CEO of the cryptography and data security company, Baltimore Technologies, Fran took the company from a small operation to a global enterprise with a market cap of $13.6 billion; twice named Ireland’s Company of the Year. Fran was also presented with the 2000 Businessman of the Year by the President of Ireland and 2001 Entrepreneur of the Year by the Bank of Ireland.

Early life
Rooney studied at CBS Westland Row,. Institute of Public Amininistration, Institute of Chartered. Accountants and the Honourable Society of Kinns Inns.. he managed anted this alongside playing Fooutall and all things sporting as building his early career.

Football career
He was Chief Executive Officer of the Football Association of Ireland from May 2003 to November 2004.

He took on the role of CEO to bring about change in the running of football because of his passion for the game. Previously he had an active career as a footballer playing for Shamrock Rovers, Home Farm and St Patrick's Athletic and coached football and Gaelic Football teams. He became a football manager managing a number of teams and took on the role the Republic of Ireland women's national football team manager from 1986 to 1992.

Early business career 
 Higher Executive Officer, Variety of roles in Irish Government Sector.
 An Post – Systems Analyst, Responsible for designing, developing and implementing high end computer systems.
 National Irish Bank – 1990–1993 General Manager
 Meridian – 1993–1994 – Managing Director
 Quay Financial Software – 1994–1996 – CEO

Baltimore technologies 
Baltimore Technologies was founded by Michael Pureser in the 1970s. In 1996 it was acquired by a team funded by Dermot Desmond and led by Fran Rooney. As CEO Fran Rooney developed Baltimore Technologies to a global data security company. He developed products, marketed company and listed on NASDAQ and London Stock Exchange (achieved FTSE 100 status) with a market capitalisation of €13.6 billion, 1,400  employees and offices in 23 cities worldwide.

In 1998 Bill Clinton and Bertie Ahern signed an Electronic Commerce deal using Baltimore's technology.  Under Rooney's leadership Baltimore underwent several successful mergers, became a member of the FTSE 100, and was also successfully listed on the NASDAQ.  Baltimore Technologies was Company of the Year in 1998 and 2000.  In 2000, Mr. Rooney was awarded Businessman of the Year and was presented with his award by the President of Ireland, Mary McAleese. He was Bank of Ireland Entrepreneur of the Year in 2001.

Business career – continued 
 National Irish Bank – Corporate Banking – Asset Finance – Credit Cards
 Vimio – 2004–2005 – Executive Chairman – Successful listing on London AIM Stock Market
 Ice Broadband 2004–2008 – Executive Chairman – National Broadband installation
 Mingo – 2017 Cryptocurrency – Executive Chairman

Barrister at law 
FRAN Rooney, the former Baltimore Technologies tycoon and ex-chief executive of the FAI, qualified as a barrister at the age of 52.''

Achievements and certificates 
 Businessman of the Year 2001 (Presented by President of Ireland)
 Entrepreneur of the Year 2001
 Product of the Year 2000
 Product of the Year 1999
 Fellow of the Institute of Chartered Accountancy
 Fellow of the Irish Computer Society
 Fellow of the Institute of Internal Auditors

Education 
 Honourable Society Kings Inn
 Bachelor of Law Degree 2008
 Honourable Society Kings Inn
 Diploma in Legal Studies 2004–2007
 Institute of Chartered Accountants
 Chartered Accountant 1986–1989
 Institute of Public Administration
 Honours Degree in Administrative Science 1986
 Honours Diploma in Administrative Science 1985

References

Living people
League of Ireland players
Businesspeople from Dublin (city)
Shamrock Rovers F.C. players
St Patrick's Athletic F.C. players
Home Farm F.C. players
Football Association of Ireland officials
Republic of Ireland women's national football team managers
Association footballers not categorized by position
Republic of Ireland association footballers
Republic of Ireland football managers
Year of birth missing (living people)